Peter-Hugo Daly (born 1956 in Islington, London) is an actor and musician. In the late 1970s and early 1980s, he was a member of new wave band the Cross along with fellow actor Phil Daniels. The band released a 1979 single, "Kill Another Night", on RCA Records. In 1980, Daly appeared with Daniels as drummer Mick "Lethal" in the Hazel O'Connor film Breaking Glass.

Extensive television appearances include Minder, Bergerac, The Bill, Birds of a Feather, Foyle's War, Martin Chuzzlewit, Silent Witness, New Tricks, Midsomer Murders, Between the Lines, Little Dorrit, The History Man, Lark Rise to Candleford,  Alan Bleasdale's G.B.H. and as Dave Morris in McLibel!. He appeared in two of the Sharpe television films: Sharpe's Gold (1995) and Sharpe's Challenge (2006).

Film appearances include Julian Temple's Absolute Beginners, Martin Scorsese's Gangs of New York, Woody Allen's Cassandra's Dream and Made in Dagenham.

Theatre credits include Kid in  Strawberry Fields (1977) at Royal National Theatre, Crass in The Ragged Trousered Philanthropists, Saved at Royal Court Theatre and Class Enemy.

Partial filmography
Breaking Glass (1980) - Mick
Oxford Blues (1984) - Malcolm
Absolute Beginners (1986) - Vern
Madame Sousatzka (1988) - Roadie
Schluckauf (1992) - Freddy
The General (1998) - Beavis, Fence
Mauvaise Passe (1999) - Marco
Paranoid (2000) - Ellis
Secret Society (2000) - Barry
This Filthy Earth (2001) - Jesus Christ
Gangs of New York (2002) - One-Armed Priest 
Cassandra's Dream (2007) - Boat Owner 
Love Me Still (2008) - Mark
Made in Dagenham (2010) - Bartholomew
Wild Bill (2011) - Keith
Electricity (2014) - Mr. Morris
Angel (2015) - Uncle Tommy

External links

Living people
English male film actors
1956 births